Tekeda Alemu (born in Addis Ababa, May 5, 1951) is an Ethiopian diplomat to the United Nations.

Education 
Tekeda earned a B.A. and M.A. from UCLA and a Ph.D. from Claremont Graduate School.

Career 
Tekeda Alemu has served as a diplomat for four decades, starting in 1983.

For the month of September 2017, Alemu served as the president of the United Nations Security Council.

Other activities 
 UNICEF, Vice-President of the Executive Board (2018)

References

External links

Ethiopian diplomats
Living people
1951 births
People from Addis Ababa